Paul Quinn (28 March 1938 – 19 June 2015) was an Australian rugby league footballer who played in the 1960s. An Australian international and New South Wales interstate representative forward, he played club football on the New South Wales South Coast as well in Sydney's NSWRFL Premiership with Newtown.

Gerringong forward Quinn first played representative rugby league for Southern Division against a touring Great Britain side in 1962, breaking into the Country NSW and New South Wales sides the following year. Also in 1963, he was first selected to represent Australia, becoming Kangaroo No. 384. Quinn then toured with the 1963-64 Kangaroos, playing in the 'Swinton Massacre' which secured the Ashes for Australia in England for the first time. Upon his return to Australia, he signed with Sydney club Newtown, playing for the team for four seasons in the NSWRFL Premiership and becoming captain. He played further Test matches in 1964 against France and also went on the 1965 tour of New Zealand.

Quinn returned to the South coast in 1968, playing for the Nowra club and also captaining Country NSW. After retiring he pursued a career as a sports journalist in Canberra.

In 2008, the centenary of rugby league in Australia, Quinn was named on the bench in the Newtown Jets 'Team of the Century'.

It was announced on the Newtown Jets Facebook page that Paul Quinn died in Canberra on 19 June 2015 aged 77.

References

1938 births
2015 deaths
Australia national rugby league team players
Australian rugby league players
City New South Wales rugby league team players
Country New South Wales rugby league team players
New South Wales rugby league team coaches
New South Wales rugby league team players
Newtown Jets players
Rugby league players from Nowra, New South Wales
Rugby league props